Samoeng Tai is a tambon (sub-district) of Samoeng District, in Chiang Mai Province, Thailand. In 2005 it had a population of 5,366 people. The tambon contains 11 villages.

References

External links

Tambon of Chiang Mai province
Populated places in Chiang Mai province
Cities and towns in Thailand
Cities and towns in Chiang Mai province